Rattowal is a village of Mandi Bahauddin District, in Punjab, Pakistan. The village has a population of approximately 10,000 people. It is a modern village of northern Punjab.

Geography

Education
Government Islamia Millet High School for Boys, established in early 70s, is a famous progressive school in Madhray Rattowal. The village also hosts the Government High School for Girls.Two Government primary schools for boys and one Government primary school for Girls. There are also private schools in the village.

Weather
This village has a moderate climate, it remains hot in summer and cold in winter. The winter months are mild and the minimum temperature may fall below .

History
Rattowal is a progressed village of Punjab. It is founded about 200 years ago by the Ranjha Bradry (a cast in Punjab). But there are many other groups of people living in the village since hundreds of years.

References

Villages in Mandi Bahauddin District